Hotel Claridge is a historic hotel building in Memphis, Tennessee, U.S.. It was built in 1924 for Charles Levy and Morris Corn, two businessmen from St. Louis, Missouri. Its construction cost $1.5 million, and it was designed by the Memphis architectural firm of Jones & Furbringer and the St. Louis firm of Barnett, Haynes & Barnett.

Hotel Claridge is at 109 North Main Street in Memphis.  In the 1930s and 40s, it housed the studios of radio station 560 AM WHBQ.

It has been listed on the National Register of Historic Places since April 29, 1982.

References

External links

National Register of Historic Places in Tennessee
Hotel buildings completed in 1924
Hotels in Memphis, Tennessee